Four Oaks may refer to the following places:

Four Oaks, East Sussex, an area in England
Four Oaks, Gloucestershire, an area in England
Four Oaks, Kent, an area in England
Four Oaks, Kentucky, United States
Four Oaks, North Carolina, a town in North Carolina, United States
Four Oaks, Solihull, an area in England
Four Oaks, Sutton Coldfield, West Midlands, an area in England